Kormi-ye Pain (also Romanized as Kormī-ye Pā’īn; also known as Kormī) is a village in Piveshk Rural District, Lirdaf District, Jask County, Hormozgan Province, Iran. At the 2006 census, its population was 60, in 16 families.

References 

Populated places in Jask County